Kostyantyn Pronenko (born 26 November 1971) is a Ukrainian rower. He competed in the men's double sculls event at the 2000 Summer Olympics.

References

External links
 

1971 births
Living people
Ukrainian male rowers
Olympic rowers of Ukraine
Rowers at the 2000 Summer Olympics
Sportspeople from Dnipro